The Brooklyn Hotel is a historic building located in Brooklyn, Iowa, United States.  John Byers, who operated a grocery store and billiard hall, built the structure as a house in 1875.  Subsequent owners operated a hotel here.  It was known as the Brooklyn Hotel as early as 1894.  Dr. Charles Busby was the exception.  He operated a small hospital here in the early in the 20th century.  The 2½-story building features a three-story entrance tower, bracketed eaves, window sills of limestone quarried nearby, and an irregular plan.  The hotel was listed on the National Register of Historic Places in 1979.

References

Hotel buildings completed in 1875
Italianate architecture in Iowa
National Register of Historic Places in Poweshiek County, Iowa
Buildings and structures in Poweshiek County, Iowa
Hotel buildings on the National Register of Historic Places in Iowa